Joseph Sloan Bonsall Jr. (born May 18, 1948) is an American singer who has been the tenor of the country/gospel vocal quartet The Oak Ridge Boys since October 1973. He is also an author. Besides charting numerous hits as a member of the Oak Ridge Boys, Bonsall has a solo chart credit alongside the band Sawyer Brown in their 1986 single "Out Goin' Cattin'", on which he was credited as "Cat Joe Bonsall".

In 1997, Bonsall released a four-part children's book series titled The Molly Books and in 2003 published GI Joe and Lillie, a book about his parents' lives during and after World War II.

He was born in 1948 to Joseph Sloan Bonsall Sr. (1925–2001), and Lillie Maude Collins (1924–2001). Both are buried at Arlington National Cemetery. His younger sister Nancy Marie was born on August 24, 1953.

Discography

Singles

References

External links
 
 
 

1948 births
Living people
Musicians from Philadelphia
American country singer-songwriters
American gospel singers
American tenors
The Oak Ridge Boys members
Singer-songwriters from Pennsylvania
Country musicians from Pennsylvania
American male singer-songwriters